Nedim Bajrami (born 28 February 1999) is a professional footballer who plays as an attacking midfielder for Italian  club Sassuolo, on loan from Empoli. Born and raised in Switzerland to ethnic Albanian parents, Bajrami represented the Swiss youth national teams before opting to represent senior the Albania national team.

Club career
Bajrami was born in Switzerland, he spent all of his youth career with professional side Grasshoppers. He signed his first professional contract alongside teammates Petar Pusic and Arijan Qollaku in February 2017, and made his debut the same month, playing the full 90 minutes of a 1–0 loss to FC Thun.

On 13 August 2019, Bajrami joined Italian Serie B club Empoli on loan with an option to buy.

On 31 January 2023, Bajrami moved to Sassuolo on loan with an obligation to buy.

International career
Bajrami has represented Switzerland up to under-19 level. He played for the Switzerland U17 team in their unsuccessful European Under-17 Championship qualification bid in 2016, featuring in all their six games. He scored a total of five goals for the under-17 side, including a brace against Montenegro in 2015. On 9 March 2021, Switzerland's U-21 manager Mauro Lustrinelli confirmed that Bajrami chose to switch alliances and represent his country of origin, Albania. On 17 March 2021 he received Albanian citizenship, thus needing only a permission by FIFA to become eligible to play for the Albania national team. He received the go ahead from Court of Arbitration for Sport on 30 August 2021. He debuted with Albania in a 1–0 2022 FIFA World Cup qualification win over Hungary on 5 September 2021 by coming on as a substitute in the 63rd minute in place of Qazim Laçi.

Career statistics

Club

International

References

External links
 Under-15 Profile at football.ch
 Under-16 Profile at football.ch
 Under-17 Profile at football.ch
 Under-18 Profile at football.ch
 Under-19 Profile at football.ch

1999 births
Living people
Swiss people of Macedonian descent
Swiss people of Albanian descent
Albanian footballers
Swiss men's footballers
Macedonian footballers
Footballers from Zürich
Association football midfielders
Albania international footballers
Switzerland under-21 international footballers
Switzerland youth international footballers
Grasshopper Club Zürich players
Empoli F.C. players
U.S. Sassuolo Calcio players
Swiss Super League players
Serie A players
Serie B players
Albanian expatriate footballers
Swiss expatriate footballers
Macedonian expatriate footballers
Expatriate footballers in Italy
Swiss expatriate sportspeople in Italy
Albanian expatriate sportspeople in Italy